Anton Nemkin (born August 22, 1983, Maykop, Adygea) is a Russian political figure and a deputy of the 8th State Duma.

Until 2014, Nemkin served at the Federal Security Service. From 2017 to 2021, he was registered as an individual entrepreneur. In 2017–2018, he was a pilot of the Russian auto racing series Mitjet 2L and piloted a racing car Honda Civic. In 2017, he created the "Motor Sharks" racing team. In 2019, he became a part of the Russian Circuit Racing Series. In 2018, Nemkin founded a fund titled "Sochi Digital Valley" with an estimated volume of private investment of 250 million rubles. Since September 2021, he has served as the deputy of the 8th State Duma.

He is one of the members of the State Duma the United States Treasury sanctioned on 24 March 2022 in response to the 2022 Russian invasion of Ukraine.

References

1983 births
Living people
United Russia politicians
21st-century Russian politicians
Eighth convocation members of the State Duma (Russian Federation)
Russian individuals subject to the U.S. Department of the Treasury sanctions

Russian Circuit Racing Series drivers
Russian racing drivers